USMC are the initials for the United States Marine Corps.

USMC may also refer to:

Organizations
 United Shoe Machinery Corporation
 United States Maritime Commission
 United States Motor Company
 University of St. Michael's College, a college of the University of Toronto, Canada

Other uses
 United States–Mexico–Canada Agreement, a free trade agreement